This is a list of Australian films of the 1920s. For a complete alphabetical list, see :Category:Australian films.

1920s

See also
 1920 in Australia
 1921 in Australia
 1922 in Australia
 1923 in Australia
 1924 in Australia
 1925 in Australia
 1926 in Australia
 1927 in Australia
 1928 in Australia
 1929 in Australia

External links
 Australian film at the Internet Movie Database

 
 
1920s
Australian
Films